Mayville High School is a public high school located in Mayville, Wisconsin. It serves grades 9 through 12 and is the only high school in the Mayville School District.

History 
The original Mayville High School was built around 1850 as a one-room schoolhouse that housed all grades. The current building was built in 1964. After a failed 2015 referendum, a 2017 referendum to add a STEAM addition to the school passed; construction began in April 2018. In 2015, a possible plan for consolidation with Horicon High School in Horicon, Wisconsin was presented, but the plan never made it past plan stage due to a lack of interest from Horicon.

Demographics 
The school is 94 percent white, with Hispanics accounting for four percent of the student body and all other races combining for the other two percent. About a quarter of students qualify for free or reduced lunch.

Academics 
MHS students have the opportunity to take Advanced Placement classes. About a third of students take part in AP classes.

Athletics 

The Cardinals compete in the Wisconsin Flyway Conference, and fluctuate between divisions two through four for various sports.

Extracurricluars 
MHS has a competitive mixed-gender show choir, the Cardinal Singers, and at one point had a competitive girls-only show choir. Cardinal Singers has won competitions as recently as 2016.

Notable alumni 
 Dick Lange, professional basketball player

References

External links 
 Mayville High School

Public high schools in Wisconsin
Schools in Dodge County, Wisconsin